The Csiky Gergely Hungarian State Theatre is a Hungarian-language theatre in Timișoara, Romania, founded in 1957. Its predecessor was the Hungarian section of the State Theater in Timișoara, established as a professional theatre in 1953.

History

Beginnings 
The first Hungarian theatre performance was given here in 1828 by the Košice Singing and Acting Company, which was a guest in Banat, and the performances of the traveling companies became regular from the 1850s. In 1875, the guest actors of the Budapest National Theatre inaugurated Ede Szigligeti's A nőuralom in the building that houses the current three independent theatres and the Timișoara State Opera. Even Emperor Franz Joseph I attended the event. At the beginning, two theatre troupes operated in the building: one in German and the other in Hungarian, and on 1 February 1885, by a decision of the Timișoara City Hall, the Hungarian troupe obtained the status of permanent professional theatre. Under his directorship, many actors who later became famous began their careers in Timișoara, including Jenő Janovics, Mihály Fekete,  and Vilma Medgyaszay.

After World War I 
From August 1919, the Hungarian theatre entered a period of decline due to the fall of the Austro-Hungarian Empire, the introduction of censorship, new concession conditions, and later, in 1920, due to the fire in which the theatre building burned almost completely. In addition, in 1921, the new law on theatres was promulgated, which discriminated against minority theatres and which practically put an end to the Hungarian professional theatre in Timișoara.

After World War II 
The Hungarian-language theatre was practically reborn in 1953, when a troupe was set up consisting of members of the theatre ensemble attached to the Timișoara City Hall and of actors of Jódy Károly's Arad and Timișoara troupes. The first appointed director of the new troupe was Emil Josan. The inauguration took place on 3 May 1953 in the "Great Hall", the same that has since served the two troupes of the Hungarian and German theatres, with the comedy Ingyenélők by Gergely Csiky.

After a period of rise, in which the Hungarian Theatre of Timișoara established itself as one of the most valuable theatres in Romania, in the 1980s, the repertoire became dependent on the requirements of the communist dictatorship, and the institution had to resort to drastic self-financing measures. The effects could be seen quickly, by the sudden reduction of the troupe, by the retirement or departure of the young actors, but also by the alarming dilution of the repertoire – only light comedies, musical and cabinet performances of poor quality were staged.

References 

Theatres in Timișoara
Hungarians in Romania
1957 establishments in Romania